The National Women's Soccer League Players Association Awards (often called the NWSLPA Awards or the NWSL Players' Awards) are annual awards voted on by the players of the National Women's Soccer League (NWSL) since 2019. These awards are presented by the National Women's Soccer League Players Association (NWSLPA), the trade union representing non-allocated players in the NWSL. They are considered one of the major end-of-season awards for NWSL players alongside the league's own awards. As there are often differences between the league's own awards and the NWSL Players' Awards, many NWSL players consider the NWSL Players' Awards to be more prestigious as they are decided by only players themselves.

Players' Player of the Year

Players' Rookie of the Year

Players' Team of the Year

2019 
Source

See also 
 NWSL awards

References

External links 
 Official website
 
 

National Women's Soccer League awards

Awards established in 2019
National Women's Soccer League lists